Garo H. Armen is an American-Armenian scientist and philanthropist. He is the founder and chairman of the Children of Armenia Fund (COAF), as well as co-founder and CEO of Agenus, Inc.

Early life 
An ethnic Armenian, Armen was born in Istanbul, Turkey, in 1953, and immigrated to the United States as a teenager to attend university, eventually earning his PhD in physical chemistry from the City University of New York.

Career 
After earning his PhD, Armen worked as a research associate at the Brookhaven National Laboratory and taught as an associate professor at the Merchant Marine Academy. He then served as an analyst and investment banker, focusing on chemical and pharmaceutical industries, first at E.F. Hutton, then at Dean Witter Reynolds (now Morgan Stanley).

In 1993, Armen had a leading role in the creation of Immunex. From 1994 to 2006, Armen served on the Board of Directors at Elan, an Irish pharmaceutical firm; as chairman, he is widely credited with rescuing the company from financial ruin. Currently, he serves as Executive Chairman at Protagenic Therapeutics.

In 1994, Armen co-founded Agenus, Inc (formerly Antigenics), a biotechnology company focused on personalized medicine in immune-oncology. He currently serves as the CEO, and as the Chairman for MiNK Therapeutics, a subsidiary company.

Humanitarian work 
Armen is also the founder and chairman of the Children of Armenia Fund, established in 2004. The NGO empowers rural Armenians through initiatives focused on education, healthcare, social advancement, and economic development. As of 2022, COAF has brought resources to 107,239+ Armenians across 63 rural communities.

Honors 
In 2016, the Immigrant Learning Center in Malden, MA named Armen an Immigrant Entrepreneur of the Year.

In 2004, Armen received the prestigious Ellis Island Medal of Honor for his humanitarian efforts in Armenia.

In 2002, Ernst & Young recognized Armen as the NYC Biotechnology Entrepreneur of the Year.

References

External links
 Garo Armen - Armeniapedia.org
 Children of Armenia Fund Video Library

1953 births
Living people
American people of Armenian descent
American technology chief executives
Armenian businesspeople
Washington University in St. Louis alumni
Cornell University alumni
Turkish businesspeople
Turkish people of Armenian descent
EF Hutton people
American physical chemists